Alfred Desroziers, full name André Jules Alfred Desroziers, (26 January 1807 – 9 March 1870) was a French poet, playwright, and librettist

His plays were presented on the several Parisian stages of the 19th century, including the Théâtre de la Gaîté, the Théâtre des Bouffes-Parisiens, the Théâtre du Vaudeville, and the Théâtre du Palais-Royal.

He also wrote under the pen name Deléris and Alfred de Léris (from his mother's name).

Works 

1833: Trois nouvelles et un conte
1840: Zizine, ou l'École de déclamation, vaudeville in 1 act
1840: Les Oiseaux de Bocace ["sic"], vaudeville in 1 act, with Saint-Yves
1840: L'Autre ou les Deux maris, vaudeville in 1 act, with Saint-Yves
1840: Un mariage russe, comédie en vaudevilles in 2 acts, with Félix Dutertre de Véteuil
1840: Misère et génie, drama in 1 act, with Henri de Tully
1841: La mère et l'enfant se portent bien, comédie en vaudevilles in 1 act, with Dumanoir and Henri de Tully
1842: Les Quatre quartiers de la lune, drama-vaudeville in 4 acts
1843: L'Amour à l'aveuglette, vaudeville in 1 act, with Édouard Louis Alexandre Brisebarre
1843: Un miracle de l'amour, comédie en vaudevilles in 1 act, with Eugène Devaux
1844: Les Caravanes d'Ulysse, vaudeville in 2 acts
1844: Les Jolies Filles du Maroc, play in 3 acts, mingled with couplets, with Louis Couailhac and Adolphe Guénée
1844: Lady Henriette, ou le Marché aux servantes, drama-vaudeville in 5 acts
1844: Le Ménage de Rigolette, interior tableau mingled with songs, in 1 act, with Brisebarre
1844: La Tête de singe, vaudeville in 2 acts, with Dumanoir and Saint-Yves
1845: Les Viveurs, drama in 6 acts mingled with songs, with Clairville
1846: Le Châle bleu, comedy in 2 acts, mingled with couplets, with Brisebarre
1846: L'Oiseau de paradis, féerie play in 3 acts and 14 tableaux, with Louis Couailhac and Guénée
1846: Le Baron de Castel-Sarrazin, comédie en vaudevilles in 1 act, with Clairville and Saint-Yves
1848: Le Gentilhomme campagnard, vaudeville in 1 act, with Brisebarre
1848: Les 20 sous de Périnette, vaudeville in 1 act, with Brisebarre
1850: Portes et Placards, comédie en vaudevilles in 1 act, with Charles Varin
1851: Royal-tambour, comédie-vaudeville en 1 act, with Brisebarre
1852: Un drôle de pistolet, comédie en vaudevilles in 2 acts, with Varin
1852: L'Habit de Mylord, opéra comique in 1 act, with Thomas Sauvage
1852: La Jolie Meunière, vaudeville in 1 act
1852: Poste restante, vaudeville in 1 act, with Louis Couailhac
1853: Les Moutons de Panurge, grande lanterne magique in 3 acts and 12 tableaux including 1 prologue
1855: Mes vieux amis, poetry
1855: Le Pâté de canard, vaudeville in 1 act, with Dutertre
1856: L'Orgue de Barbarie, operetta bouffa in 1 act
1857: Au clair de la lune, operetta in 1 act
1857: Le Pot de fer et le Pot de terre, vaudeville in 1 act, with Antonin d'Avrecourt and Ernest-Georges Petitjean
1858: Simone, opérette en 1 act
1860: Les Profits du jaloux, comedy in 1 act
1862: Les Deux dots, comédie en vaudevilles in 1 act, with Armand-Numa Jautard
1867: Le Danseur de corde, opéra-comique en 2 acts, with Brisebarre
1868: Les maris sont esclaves, comédy in 3 acts, in prose
1869: Pourquoi l'on aime, comédy in 1 act

Bibliography 
 Edmond Antoine Poinsot, Dictionnaire des pseudonymes, 1869, "Desroziers (Alfred)", p. 36.
 Pierre Larousse, Grand dictionnaire universel du XIXe siècle, "Léris (André-Jules-Alfred Desroziers, connu sous le nom de De)", vol. 10 (1873), p. 395.

19th-century French poets
19th-century French dramatists and playwrights
French librettists
Writers from Paris
1807 births
1870 deaths
French male poets
19th-century French male writers